Mark Summer is the original cellist of the Turtle Island Quartet; he is a co-founder of the quartet and performed with Turtle Island (a.k.a. Turtle Island String Quartet) from its founding in 1985 until the fall of 2015.

Biography
Born on April 3, 1958 in Encino, CA, Summer grew up in Los Angeles, California playing piano, guitar and, from the age of nine, cello. From the beginning he was very interested in alternative genres, and as a teenager playing in a rock band called The Purple Testament, later known as The Plague.  Summer studied cello with Edwin Geber of the Los Angeles Philharmonic, then with Geber’s wife Gretchen Geber, and graduated from the Cleveland Institute of Music, continuing his studies with the Geber family with Stephen Geber as a cello performance major. After conservatory, Summer worked in the Winnipeg Symphony Orchestra for three years. Looking for alternative genres, he went on to play in an assortment of alternative ensembles until, in Winnipeg, he met the violinist Darol Anger. Shortly after, he was invited by David Balakrishnan and Anger to join Turtle Island, and moved to the San Francisco Bay Area in 1985 to perform permanently with the band. Summer left the band in 2015 to pursue a solo career. In 2011, Summer made his solo concerto debut with the Alexandria Symphony, performing Balakrishnan's Force of Nature, written especially for him. He has lived in the town of Novato, outside of San Francisco since 2009.

Music
Besides the Turtle Island Quartet, which has released fifteen albums, Summer has played with many other crossover artists. He was a member of the Jazz Chamber Trio with the pianist Alon Yavnai and the Grammy-winning clarinetist Paquito D'Rivera which played primarily Latin jazz. He has also composed pieces for solo cello, including Kalimba and Julie-O, (both the solo and duo versions), the last of which has become very popular among cellists and was included in a 2015 advertising campaign for the Apple Watch. He has also arranged pieces for solo cello including "Lo, How a Rose E'er Blooming" and Jimi Hendrix's "Little Wing". He currently performs in a trio with 7 time Grammy winning jazz vocalist Tierney Sutton and is featured on 4 tracks of Ms. Sutton's Grammy nominated recording, "AfterBlue".

References

External links
Mark Summer interview
Official Turtle Island Quartet biography

Living people
1958 births
American jazz cellists
American jazz composers
Cleveland Institute of Music alumni
American male jazz composers
Turtle Island Quartet members